Das Bild may refer to
 Bild, a German newspaper
 "Das Bild" (Schubert), a song composed in 1815